Shibuya, Tokyo, Japan held a mayoral election on April 27, 2003. Kuwahara Toshitake, an independent, won.

 
 
 
 
 
 

Shibuya
Mayoral elections in Japan
2003 elections in Japan
2003 in Japan
April 2003 events in Japan